Eshqabad (also Romanized as ‘Eshqābād) is a village in Rabor Rural District, in the Central District of Rabor County, Kerman Province, Iran. At the 2006 census, its population was 24, in 5 families.

References 

Populated places in Rabor County